Hypocalymma jessicae is a member of the family Myrtaceae endemic to Western Australia.

It blooms between November and April producing pink flowers.

It is found along the south coast in gullies, along road verges and on ridges in the Great Southern region of Western Australia where it grows in sandy soils over granite.

References

jessicae
Endemic flora of Western Australia
Rosids of Western Australia
Plants described in 2002
Taxa named by Gregory John Keighery
Taxa named by Arne Strid